Ashton Lambie (born December 12, 1990) is an American track cyclist known for being the first person to complete an Individual pursuit in under 4 minutes, and for his moustache.

Career
Lambie races on gravel in Kansas. In October 2015, he set the World Ultracycling Association record for cycling across his home state of Kansas from West to East. This record was surpassed a few months later in May of 2016. In his debut at the Track National Championship, Lambie won the Individual Pursuit, and finished second in the omnium and points race. This earned Lambie a spot on Team USA. His first race with Team USA was the 2017 Pan-American Championships.

Major results
2017
National Track Championships
1st  Individual pursuit
2nd Omnium
2nd Points race
 3rd  Team pursuit, UCI Track World Cup, Santiago
2018
National Track Championships
1st  Individual pursuit
3rd Omnium
 Pan American Championships
1st  Individual pursuit
1st  Team pursuit
2019
 1st Men's Unbound Gravel 100
 Pan American Championships
1st  Individual pursuit
2nd Team pursuit
2020
 2nd  Individual pursuit, UCI Track World Championships
2021
 1st  Individual pursuit, UCI Track World Championships

World records

Personal life 
Lambie is a partner of racing cyclist and NASA astronaut candidate Christina Birch.

References

External links
 

1990 births
Living people
American male cyclists
American track cyclists
Sportspeople from Lincoln, Nebraska
Cyclists at the 2019 Pan American Games
Pan American Games medalists in cycling
Pan American Games gold medalists for the United States
Medalists at the 2019 Pan American Games
UCI Track Cycling World Champions (men)
Cyclists from Nebraska
Sports world record holders
21st-century American people